FloydFest is a Music and arts festival held annually near Floyd, Virginia, in the Blue Ridge Mountains

History
The event began in 2002, and spans five days each year with on-site camping and multiple stages featuring rock, bluegrass, reggae, folk, Yiddish, Cajun, or Zydeco, African, Appalachian, and world music performers. The event was cancelled in 2020 due to the COVID-19 pandemic; the 19th edition was deferred to 2021.

In addition to music, the festival features local arts and crafts, dance workshops, morning yoga lessons, story telling, poetry readings, and a "Children's Universe" tent.

Each year, FloydFest features a theme:
2002: Floyd County World Music Festival
2003: Out Of This World Music
2004: Midsummer's Dream
2005: Rock of Ages
2006: Roots Alive
2007: It's in the Mix
2008: Family Affair
2009: Revival
2010: Breaking Ground
2011: The eXperience
2012: Lovers Rock
2013: Rise & Shine
2014: Revolutionary
2015: Fire on the Mountain
2016: Dreamweavin2017: Freedom
2018: Wild
2019: Voyage Home
2021: Odyssey (no 2020 event)

Performers
Each of the following sections has a list of notable performers for that year.

2002: Floyd County World Music Festival

African Showboyz
Doc Watson
John Scofield
Rhonda Vincent
Sam Bush
The Neville Brothers

2003: Out Of This World Music

Baka Beyond
David Grisman Quintet
Garaj Mahal
Nickel Creek
Old & In the Gray
Reeltime Travelers
The Hackensaw Boys

2004: Midsummer's Dream

Acoustic Syndicate
Culture
Dar Williams
Del McCoury Band
Donna the Buffalo
Railroad Earth
Sam Bush
Steep Canyon Rangers
Tempest

2005: Rock of Ages

Ani DiFranco
Asylum Street Spankers
Corey Harris
Discordian Society
Donna the Buffalo
Hot Tuna
J. D. Crowe
Jackass Flats
Jan Smith
Jim Lauderdale
Kruger Brothers
Michael Farr
Old School Freight Train
Railroad Earth
Scott Miller and the Commonwealth
Soldiers of Jah Army
Steve Riley & the Mamou Playboys
The Avett Brothers
Tortured Soul
Xavier Rudd

2006: Roots Alive

Balfa Toujours
Cyro Baptista
Eddie From Ohio
Iris Dement
Los Lobos
Rory Block
The Avett Brothers
Tim O'Brien

2007: It's in the Mix

Carolina Chocolate Drops
DeVotchKa
North Mississippi Allstars
Red Stick Ramblers
Rose's Pawn Shop
Sons of Bill
The Duhks
The Hackensaw Boys

2009: Revival

Blues Traveler (with special guest "Survivorman" Les Stroud)
Blues and Lasers
Donna the Buffalo
EOTO
Folk Soul Revival
Forro in the Dark
Grace Potter and the Nocturnals
Grupo Fantasma
Holy Ghost Tent Revival
Hot 8 Brass Band
Lee Boys
Luminescent Orchestrii
My Radio
Nathan Moore
Ollabelle
Railroad Earth
Raw Dawg
Rooster Blues
Rose's Pawn Shop
Sxip Shirey
The Belleville Outfit
The Bittersweets
The Duhks
The Felice Brothers
The Horse Flies
The Old Ceremony
The Sadies
Toubab Krewe
Yard Dogs Road Show

2010: Breaking Ground
Johnson’s Crossroad
Levon Helm
Old Crow Medicine Show
Pimps of Joytime

2012: Lovers Rock

ALO
Alison Krauss & Union Station (feat. Jerry Douglas)
American Aquarium
Anders Osborne
Chris Thile
Brandi Carlile
Bruce Hornsby & the Noisemakers
David Wax Museum
Dawes
Drew Emmitt Band
Drive-By Truckers
Galactic (with special guest Corey Henry)
Garage A Trois
Gary Clark Jr.
Gregory Alan Isakov
Ha Ha Tonka
Hoots & Hellmouth
Jackson Browne
Jonathan Wilson
Leftover Salmon
Locos Por Juana
MarchFourth Marching Band
Marco Benevento
Matisyahu
Michael Franti & Spearhead
Orgone
Ozomatli
Punch Brothers
Ricky Skaggs & Kentucky Thunder
SOJA
Steep Canyon Rangers
Toubab Krewe

2013: Rise & Shine

Ben Sollee
Blitzen Trapper
Bombino
Brandi Carlile
Bronze Radio Return 
Citizen Cope
Delta Rae
Donavon Frankenreiter
Edward Sharpe and the Magnetic Zeros
Field Report
GAUDI
Gigamesh
Gogol Bordello
Hogmaw
Hot Tuna
Jason Isbell and The 400 Unit
John Butler Trio
Lake Street Dive
Larry and His Flask
Lizzy Ross Band
Megan Jean & The KFB
Michael Kiwanuka
Nahko and Medicine for the People
Nick Driver Band
No BS! Brass Band
North Mississippi Allstars
Old Crow Medicine Show
Option 22
Primate Fiasco
Railroad Earth
Rising Appalachia
Sanctum Sully
Spirit Family Reunion
Tauk
The Devil Makes Three
The Hackensaw Boys 
The Infamous Stringdusters
The Last Bison
The Lumineers
The Manx
Trampled by Turtles
Xavier Rudd
Yonder Mountain String Band

2014: Revolutionary

Ben Harper & Charlie Musselwhite
Ben Miller Band
Buddy Guy
Carolina Chocolate Drops
Conspirator
Crystal Bright & the Silver Hands
Donna the Buffalo
Groundation
JJ Grey & MOFRO
Lauryn Hill
Lettuce
Michael Franti & Spearhead
Paper Bird
Quinn Sullivan
Ray LaMontagne
Rising Appalachia
Robert Randolph and the Family Band
The Campbell Brothers
The Duhks
The Hackensaw Boys
The Lee Boys
The London Souls
Thievery Corporation
Ziggy Marley
Mighty Joshua  

2015: Fire on the Mountain

American Aquarium
Blair Crimmins & The Hookers
Brandi Carlile
Chris Robinson Brotherhood
Driftwood
Drive-by Truckers
Emmylou Harris & Rodney Crowell
Fear of Music
First Aid Kit
Folk Soul Revival
Grace Potter and the Nocturnals
Greensky Bluegrass
Jerry Douglas Presents The Earls of Leicester
Keller Williams
Keller Williams' Grateful Grass with Jeff Austin & Others
Leftover Salmon
Lord Huron
Nicki Bluhm & The Gramblers
Peter Rowan's Twang 'An Groove
Rayland Baxter
Shovels & Rope
Sirsy
Sister Sparrow & the Dirty Birds
The Devil Makes Three
The Oh Hellos
Trampled by Turtles
Trigger Hippy

2016: Dreamweavin'

Gregg Allman
Bruce Hornsby & The Noisemakers
Leftover Salmon
Nahko & Medicine for the People
Railroad Earth
Keller Williams w/ More Than A Little+
Femi Kuti & Positive Force
Shakey Graves
The Wood Brothers
Greensky Bluegrass
Elephant Revival
Anders Osborne
Pimps of Joytime
Rich Robinson
Bombino
Monophonics
Otis Taylor Band
The Larry Keel Experience
Love Canon
Con Brio
The Legendary Shack Shakers
Head for the Hills
Liz Vice
Los Colognes
Roosterfoot
Look Homeward
The Midatlantic
Bloodkin
The Steepwater Band
Dead 27s
Mingo Fishtrap
The Show Ponies
Honey Island Swamp Band
Polyrhythmics
The Congress
Banditos
Caravan of Thieves
Dead Winter Carpenters
Dustbowl Revival
TigermanWOAH!
These Wild Plains
Dirty Bangs
Cask Mouse
Cactus Attack
The Hip Abduction

 2017: Freedom 

Thievery Corporation 
Michael Franti & Spearhead 
St. Paul & the Broken Bones 
Rising Appalachia 
Leftover Salmon 
Steel Pulse 
Railroad Earth 
Shovels & Rope 
Marty Stuart & His Fabulous Superlatives 
Buffalo Mountain Jam  
Xavier Rudd 
White Denim 
Turkuaz
Fruition 
Keller Williams 
TAUK 
The Steel Wheels 
Larry Keel Experience
Nicola Cruz 
honeyhoney 
Vurro 
BIG Something 
Shook Twins 
The Hip Abduction
Baskery 
Zach Deputy 
The Mantras 
Aaron Lee Tasjan 
Fémina 
That 1 Guy 
Dave Eggar Band feat. Sasha Lazard 
The Lil’ Smokies 
People’s Blues of Richmond 
Rebekah Todd & the Odyssey 
Jack Broadbent 
Black Masala 
Hillbilly Casino 
Urban Soil 
Blue Mule 
Che Apalache 
Jordan Harman Band 
M.C. Broom & the Jam 
T Sisters 
Banditos 
Jon Stickley Trio 
The Tillers 
Alanna Royale 
The Stash! Band 
Strange Americans 
Whiskerman 
The Brother Brothers 
Honey Island Swamp Band 
Edward David Anderson 
Dead 27s 
Davy Knowles 
McLovins 
Hayley Jane and the Primates 
Broccoli Samurai 
The Drunken Hearts 
Strange Machines
Trae Pierce & the T-Stones 
Liver Down The River 
Sol Searchers 
G.O.T.E. 
Black Mountain Revival 
The Wildmans 
Fernandez Sisters 
Einstein’s Monkey 
Girls Rock Roanoke 
Community High School Band 
Jefferson Center Music Lab 
Howard Falco 
Dixon’s Violin 
Miss Kitty’s Cosmonauts 
Luna 
Party Liberation Front

 2023:~Forever~ 
 The Black Crowes
 My Morning Jacket
 Sheryl Crow
 Goose
 Elle King
 Yelawolf and Shooter Jennings Present: Sometimes Y
 Ripe
 Shane Smith and the Saints
 Altin Gün
 Nikki Lane
 The Hip Abduction
 Ian Noe
 Neighbor
 Eggy
 The Wilder Blue
 Palmyra
 The Jared Stout Band

ReviewsFloydFest 
Voted "Best Large Music Venue in Southwestern Virginia" by Virginia LivingFloydFest '04"Some larger festivals boast a similar peace, love and music philosophy, but Floyd actually lives it, not just for one weekend, but throughout the entire year."FloydFest '05"Floyd sits in a timeless, beautiful section of Virginia, far enough from bigger cities like Roanoke and Danville to feel like it's truly in the middle of nowhere."

"The only thing constant on the festival grounds was the flow of culturally powerful music and mud covered feet."FloydFest '08'

"Floydfest is an epicenter of culture for Southwest Virginia" - VA Senator, Mark Warner

Notes

Further reading
Jambase Review for Floydfest 2003, A Midsummer's Dream.
Review of Floyd Fest 2008 From HonestTune.com

External links

Dreaming Creek, photo gallery of the FloydFest stage

Folk festivals in the United States
Music festivals in Virginia
2002 establishments in Virginia
Music festivals established in 2002
Rock festivals in the United States
World music festivals